Robert Nichols may refer to:

Entertainment
 Robert Nichols (poet) (1893–1944), English writer and poet
 Robert Nichols (author) (1919–2010), American poet, playwright, novelist, and landscape architect
 Robert Nichols (actor) (1924–2013), United States actor

Sports
 Robbie Nichols (1946–2011), American football linebacker
 Robbie Nichols (ice hockey) (born 1964), Canadian ice hockey player and coach
 Bob Nichols (basketball) (1930–2013), American basketball coach
 Bob Nichols (curler), American curler
 Bobby Nichols (born 1936), golfer

Other
 Robert Nichols (politician) (born 1944), Texas State Senator, 2007–present
 Rob Nichols (born 1969), American trade association executive and former Assistant Secretary of the Treasury for Public Affairs
 Robert Nichols (identity thief) (1926–2002), American identity thief and formerly unidentified person
 Robert C. Nichols (born 1927), American psychologist
 Robert E. Nichols (1925–1996), American business journalist, president of SABEW
 Robert L. Nichols (1922–2001), United States Marine Corps general

See also
 Rob Nicol, New Zealand cricketer
 Robert Nichol (disambiguation)
 Robert Nicholls (1889–1970), Australian politician
 Robert Carter Nicholas (disambiguation)